Fabio Luigi Rapi (born 1902), was an Italian automobile designer. Worked for Fiat and later Autobianchi. He was the design director at Fiat's Dipartimento Carrozzerie Derivate e Speciali.

Notable designs
 Fiat 1100/103 TV Trasformabile
 Fiat 8V (with Dante Giacosa)
 Fiat Turbina
 Autobianchi Bianchina
 Fiat 1200 TV Spider
 Autobianchi Stellina
 Simca Vedette

References

1902 births
Year of death missing
Italian automobile designers
Fiat people